Carlos Rodríguez Díaz (born 29 April 1980 in Madrid), known simply as Carlos, is a Spanish retired footballer who played as a midfielder.

External links

1980 births
Living people
Footballers from Madrid
Spanish footballers
Association football midfielders
Segunda División players
Segunda División B players
Tercera División players
Atlético Madrid C players
Atlético Madrid B players
Atlético Madrid footballers
Racing de Ferrol footballers
Real Jaén footballers
CP Cacereño players
CF Rayo Majadahonda players